In South Africa, an elite police force known as "The Hawks" use the Volkswagen GTI as their primary law enforcement vehicle.

Some vehicles used by South African Police are mostly pick up trucks or " bakkies" as it is called in Afrikaans with a detaining canopy installed to transport suspects in to the police station. Different sections/units or departments make use of normal police cars for different tasks.

Other vehicles used are what is known as the Nyala. This is an armored vehicle used during raids in gang invested areas or during public protesting used by the POP unit. These armored vehicles are very strong and powerful and can take a lot of damage when being shot at, thrown with stones or even petrol bombs.

References 

Law enforcement in South Africa